Orthogonius rhodesianus is a species of ground beetle in the subfamily Orthogoniinae. It was described by Csiki in 1932.

References

rhodesianus
Beetles described in 1932